Tappeh Rash or Tappeh-ye Rash may refer to:
 Tappeh Rash, Ravansar, Kermanshah Province
 Tappeh Rash, Salas-e Babajani, Kermanshah Province
 Tappeh Rash, Sonqor, Kermanshah Province
 Tappeh Rash, West Azerbaijan